Hindang (IPA: [hɪn'daŋ]), officially the Municipality of Hindang, is a 5th class municipality in the province of Leyte, Philippines. According to the 2020 census, it has a population of 20,849 people.

In the north, it borders the town of Inopacan and Hilongos in the south. Himokilan is a part of Cuatro Islas (The Four Islands), in which the other three (3) remaining islands are under the administrative jurisdiction of the municipality of Hindang.

Geography

Barangays
Hindang is politically subdivided into 20 barangays. In 1957, the sitios of Kanhaayon, Kapudlosan, Himokilan, Anolon, Mahilom, Baldoza, and Tagbibi were converted into barrios.

Climate

Demographics

Economy

Education
Saint Michael College of Hindang Leyte (1948)

References

External links

 [ Philippine Standard Geographic Code]
Philippine Census Information
Local Governance Performance Management System

Municipalities of Leyte (province)